Ibrahim Shaban (born 21 April 1953) is an Egyptian weightlifter. He competed in the men's middle heavyweight event at the 1984 Summer Olympics.

References

1953 births
Living people
Egyptian male weightlifters
Olympic weightlifters of Egypt
Weightlifters at the 1984 Summer Olympics
Place of birth missing (living people)